Walter Kelsch (born 3 September 1955) is a German former footballer who played as a forward.

Club career 
Kelsch started his career with TSV Büsnau. Then he played for Stuttgarter Kickers and later on for VfB Stuttgart. In 246 Bundesliga matches he scored 54 goals.

In France he played 78 matches (20 goals) for RC Strasbourg. 67 (18) in the Division 1 and eleven (two) in the Division 2.

International career 
Kelsch won four caps (1979 and 1980) for the West Germany national team, in which he scored three goals. The matches included UEFA Euro 1980 qualifiers against Turkey and Malta and two friendlies.

Honours
VfB Stuttgart
 Bundesliga: 1983–84; runner-up: 1978–79

References

External links 
 
 
 
 

1955 births
Living people
German footballers
West German footballers
Association football forwards
Germany international footballers
Germany B international footballers
Ligue 1 players
Bundesliga players
2. Bundesliga players
Stuttgarter Kickers players
VfB Stuttgart players
RC Strasbourg Alsace players
FC 08 Homburg players
West German expatriate sportspeople in Greece
West German expatriate footballers
West German expatriate sportspeople in France
Expatriate footballers in France
Footballers from Stuttgart